Gondal is a clan of Jats and a surname in Pakistan, mainly located in Gujrat District, Jhelum District and Mandi Bahauddin District of Punjab, Pakistan.

Notable people with this surname
 Nazar Muhammad Gondal (born 1950), Pakistani politician
 Usman Gondal (born 1987), Pakistani footballer
 Vishal Gondal (born 1976), Indian entrepreneur

References

External links
Jat (caste) on Encyclopedia Britannica

Gondal
Punjabi-language surnames
Ethnic groups in Pakistan
Pakistani names